IMG Worlds of Adventure is an indoor amusement park in the United Arab Emirates in Dubai. It is Dubai's first mega themed entertainment destination. The park is divided into five "epic zones". Two of the five zones represent global brands Cartoon Network and Marvel, while IMG Boulevard and the Lost Valley – Dinosaur Adventure zones are original concepts created by the IMG Group. Novo Cinema is the fifth section of IMG Worlds of Adventure and agreement was signed between Novo Cinema and IMG World of Adventure in May 2015. The park has no connection to the multinational talent management agency IMG, and "IMG" stands for initials of the founding family.

IMG Worlds of Adventure is the second largest temperature controlled indoor themed entertainment destination in the world, covering an area in excess of 1.5 million square feet. With the capacity to welcome more than 20,000 guests a day, the destination features roller coasters, thrill rides, and other attractions based on popular Cartoon Network characters, iconic Marvel Super Heroes and animatronic dinosaurs. Other facilities include a variety of themed retail stores and dining venues, and a 12-screen Novo cinema complex.

IMG Worlds of Adventure is situated within City of Arabia, along Sheikh Mohammad Bin Zayed Road.

History 
The park was built by the Ilyas & Mustafa Galadari (IMG) Group and is the world's second largest indoor theme park. The park was part of the City of Arabia development project, a part of Dubailand, which was stalled due to the 2008 property crash. In April 2014, the park got a Dh1.2 billion loan from the Abu Dhabi Islamic Bank. The park itself is valued over Dh3.6 Billion. The park has the capacity to hold up to 20,000 daily and has at many occasions received optimum park capacity level footfall. IMG Worlds have opened its gate to guest on 31st August 2016 and now is one of the most sought after places to visit in Dubai.  

The park includes 17 themed rides, some of them which are Bespoke rides and only to be found at IMG Worlds.

IMG Worlds of Adventure has in it plans to come up with more such projects to entice and attract the domestic and international tourists to the country.

Themed areas

The theme park contains five themed areas, called "Epic Zones". The park also contains a 12-screen cinema. Falcon's Creative Group was the design company primarily involved in planning and designing the park.

Roller Coasters

Cartoon Network
Cartoon Network is one of the zones and based on cartoon characters from Cartoon Network. It contains the world's first 5D Ben 10 cinema and the largest Ben 10 store in the world.

Attractions
 The Powerpuff Girls - Mojo Jojo's Robot Rampage
 Ben 10: 5D Hero Time
 Adventure Time - The Ride of OOO with Finn & Jake
 The Amazing Ride of Gumball
 LazyTown

Live shows
 CN Live Stage Show

Restaurants and shops
 CN Feast
 Mr. Smoothy
 Richard's Around the World Café
 Finn & Jake's Everything Burrito
 Cartoon Network Classics
 Cartoon Network Store
 The Amazing World of Gumball: The Store
 Lazy Store
 Ben 10 Universe

Marvel
Marvel is another of the themed zones based on characters from Marvel (The Walt Disney Company). It was announced that this zone would feature the 3D media-based attraction, "Avengers: Battle of Ultron." The announcement made in early June, 2015, was made one month after the release of Marvel Studios' anticipated film Avengers: Age of Ultron in early May, 2015.

Attractions
 Avengers: Battle of Ultron
 Hulk: Epsilon Base 3D
 Spider-Man: Doc Ock's Revenge
 Thor: Thunder Spin
 Avengers: Flight of the Quinjets

Restaurants and shops
 Tony's Skydeck
 Chang's Golden Dragon
 Mama Scano's Of Yancy Street
 Marvel Universe
 Empire News and Comics
 Avengers Exchange
 Epsilon Command
 Daily Bugle Company Store
 Marvel Vault

Lost Valley-Dinosaur Adventure

Lost Valley-Dinosaur Adventure is an original intellectual property created for IMG Worlds of Adventure. This zone includes animatronic dinosaurs and roller coasters.

Attractions
 The Velociraptor
 Forbidden Territory
 Predator 
 Dino Carousel
 Adventure Fortress

Restaurants and shops
 Spice Valley
 Carnivore Hut 
 360 Express
 The Explorer's Supply
 Raptor Outpost
 LV Retail Cart

IMG Boulevard
IMG Boulevard is the fourth zone and welcomes and sets up guests for the other three zones.

Attractions
 The Haunted Hotel

Restaurants and shops
 Popcorn Factory
 Boulevard Gourmet
 Samosa House
 Flavors of Arabia
 The Coffeehouse
 Haunted Hotel Store
 World of Candy
 IMG Emporium

Novo Cinema 
On 10 May 2015, Novo Cinema signed an agreement with IMG World of Adventure for opening 12 multiplex screen cinemas in IMG World of Adventure. The lavish Novo 7-star comfort is complete with retail and dining offers. IMG Novo opened its gate to public in February 2019.

See also
Dubailand
Ferrari World
List of Amusement Parks in the United Arab Emirates

References

External links
 
Construction updates
Img World Annual Passes Update
Img World of Legends Theme Update
Casting for performers at Dubai’s IMG Worlds of Adventure
Novo Cinema in IMG World of Legends Theme Park Update

Amusement parks in the United Arab Emirates
Amusement parks in Dubai
Indoor amusement parks
Buildings and structures under construction in Dubai
Tourist attractions in Dubai
2016 establishments in the United Arab Emirates
Amusement parks opened in 2016